The City of Cockburn is a local government area in the southern suburbs of the Western Australian capital city of Perth about  south of Fremantle and about  south of Perth's central business district.

History 
Cockburn is named after Cockburn Sound, which was named in 1827 by Captain James Stirling after Admiral Sir George Cockburn. Sir George was born in London in 1772 and was a renowned British naval officer, eventually becoming Admiral of the Fleet and First Sea Lord. He served under Horatio Nelson during the war with France, but came to public attention and was granted his knighthood for his service in the War of 1812, in particular for the burning of Washington in 1814. It was he who took Napoleon to exile on the island of Saint Helena after the Battle of Waterloo in 1815.

In 1871, the Fremantle Road District was created under the District Roads Act 1871 to cover the area to the south and east of Fremantle, and the Fremantle Road Board was created to manage it. The original District was bounded on the north by the Swan River from Fremantle to the mouth of the Canning River; on the east by a line from Bull Creek to the junction of what is now the intersection of the Albany and South Western Highways in Armadale; on the south by a line from Armadale to, and including the Rockingham townsite; and to the west by the Indian Ocean.

In the first five years of the Board's existence most of its members served on the Fremantle Town Council.  The function of the Board was simply to provide the roads that linked Fremantle to other parts of the Colony.  By 1913 the District was divided into Wards, each electing representatives to the Board. In 1922 the Board constructed new offices at the corner of Forrest and Rockingham Roads.

In July 1923, the District received a large amount of land (gaining the localities of Atwell and Banjup and 75% of the Jandakot locality) from Jandakot Road District when that entity was abolished. On 21 January 1955, it was renamed Cockburn, after a successful referendum underlined the desire for recognition of the District's independence from Fremantle.

On 1 July 1961, Cockburn Road District became a shire following the enactment of the Local Government Act 1960, and on 24 January 1971, almost exactly 100 years after the formation of the Fremantle Road District, it became a Town in recognition of its increasingly urban nature. On 26 October 1979 the town attained City status.

In May 1966, Rottnest Island and Carnac Island were included in the boundaries of the Shire of Cockburn. However, the council has "no involvement in or responsibility for any functions relating to the control and management of the islands", which are administered directly by state government agencies.

A public inquiry into corruption in the City of Cockburn was held in 1999. The Council was suspended in April 1999 and dismissed on 30 June 2000, with administrators running the council until an election held on 6 December 2000. In 2007 the City of Cockburn was again embroiled in controversy as alleged evidence of corruption arose at the Corruption and Crime Commission.

Wards 
The city is divided into three wards, each electing three councillors.  The mayor is directly elected.

 East Ward
 West Ward
 Central Ward

Population

Suburbs 
The suburbs of the City of Cockburn with population and size figures based on the most recent Australian census:

Mayors

Heritage-listed places

As of 2023, 140 places are heritage-listed in the City of Cockburn, of which 21 are on the State Register of Heritage Places, among them the Coogee Hotel the Newmarket Hotel and the Woodman Light.

Sister cities

  Mobile, Alabama, United States – 28 September 2005
  Split, Croatia – 6 July 1998
  Yueyang, China – 28 November 1998

References

External links 
 

 
Cockburn